Worthing was a parliamentary constituency in West Sussex, centred on the town of Worthing in West Sussex. It returned one Member of Parliament (MP) to the House of Commons of the Parliament of the United Kingdom, elected by the first past the post system.

History
The constituency was created for the 1945 general election by dividing Horsham and Worthing, and abolished for the 1997 general election.  Its territory was then divided between the new constituencies of Worthing West and East Worthing and Shoreham.

Members of Parliament

Elections

Elections in the 1940s

Elections in the 1950s

Elections in the 1960s

Elections in the 1970s

Elections in the 1980s

Elections in the 1990s

Notes and references

Parliamentary constituencies in South East England (historic)
Constituencies of the Parliament of the United Kingdom established in 1945
Constituencies of the Parliament of the United Kingdom disestablished in 1997
Politics of West Sussex
Politics of Worthing